The Maritime Aquarium at Norwalk (formerly Maritime Center) is an aquarium located in the South Norwalk (or "SoNo") section of Norwalk, Connecticut.

The aquarium features harbor seals, river otters, sharks, jellyfish, loggerhead turtles, and hundreds of other animals living in re-creations of their natural Long Island Sound habitats. Three touch-tanks feature stingrays, nurse sharks,  crabs, sea stars, moon jellyfish and other coastal creatures.

In addition to its exhibits, The Maritime Aquarium offers educational programs, year-round cruises on its 64-foot research vessel R/V Spirit of the Sound, special events and camps.

Mission 

The Maritime Aquarium inspires people of all ages to appreciate and protect the Long Island Sound ecosystem and the global environment through living exhibits, marine science, and environmental education.

Attendance

The Maritime Aquarium at Norwalk is one of Connecticut's top tourist attractions. Annual attendance averages 500,000 visitors, about 100,000 of whom are from New York state. The Maritime Aquarium's estimated statewide economic impact is almost $42 million; it contributes approximately $25 million to Norwalk's economy every year.

The aquarium's budget for the 2006-2007 fiscal year was about $10.7 million. More than $4 million came in from admissions, with 36 percent coming from out-of-state visitors. Demonstrating increasing regional appeal, out-of-state attendance revenue has increased 55% since 2002.

Additional revenues are generated from educational programming fees, the gift shop, catering, business dinners, other events such as weddings, and donations. The state gave it a grant of $675,000 to promote tourism in 2007.

History

The "Maritime Center" opened July 16, 1988.  The name was changed to the "Maritime Aquarium" in July 1996 to emphasize the live animals featured there.

It first opened by renovating a former 1860s iron works factory into an IMAX theater. Visitors, as they walk past the Ray Touch Pool toward the Marine Lab, still tread on the original wood floors (under original wood beams) of the iron works. Occupying approximately 100,000 gross square feet, the first animal exhibits included harbor seals, Open Ocean and Touch Tank.

The cultural section of the aquarium originally explored boat building and human exploration of the sea, but the boat-building activities were eliminated in early 2007. In the final seven years of its 19-year run, the boat-building program constructed about 500 boats, and 20,000 children took part in classes that created more than 5,000 model boats, but aquarium officials said the shop only served three to five percent of patrons.

The boat-building shop was replaced with a new Marine Lab, with baby seahorses, jellyfish, and other new animals, as well as information on aquaculture, sustainable seafood, and responsible home aquarium keeping.

1991: Exhibit space is expanded by adding the  "Featured Exhibits" area, a semi-permanent fabric and steel structure. The first exhibit is Real Sea Monsters, featuring extinct sea creatures like Kronosaurus and Megalodon. 
1994: Outdoor exhibit space, including bleachers, is added along the Norwalk River for summertime exhibits and shows. It opens with a bird-of-prey show.
1995: Jellyfish Encounter opens. Aquarium curators solve significant challenges to display these delicate animals that are approximately 95% water.
1996: The Maritime Center changes its name to The Maritime Aquarium at Norwalk, to better identify itself to the public and underscore the increasing importance of live animal exhibits. River Otters and Ray Touch Pool open.
2001: The aquarium expands into the Hatch and Bailey factory building, converting and rehabilitating  of space into a new, $9.5 million Environmental Education Center (funded through corporate, private and state contributions). New space allows a reconfiguring of the existing aquarium:
 Giant Sea Turtles opens, including a 15,000-gallon habitat, interpretive signs, and turtle shell photo opportunity.
 A new main entrance improves visitor reception and admission.
 New Oyster Hall (group orientation space and lunchroom) opens just off of the main entrance, which allow for staging and organizing busloads of visiting students.
 New high-tech classrooms (with multimedia and wet lab facilities) are added, as are teachers' rooms, to expand the Maritime Aquarium's educational programs.
 Cascade Cafe opens with seating for 180 people.
 Gift shop moves and expands.
2006: Touch Tank is moved and greatly enhanced, creating a more natural display, allowing animals to live "on-site" and offering better access to visitors. The aquarium's volunteer staff funds reconstruction.
2007: Frogs! opens, a new permanent exhibit displaying amphibians from Long Island Sound's shores and watershed, as well as exotic species from around the world, to draw attention to the importance of amphibians as bellwether species for environmental change. The small boat building shop is closed.
2008: During the summer, the Great White Alligator is displayed in the outdoor exhibit space.
2009: African Penguins temporary outdoor exhibit opens.
2010: Temporary Meerkat Exhibit opens.
2012: FINtastic RefurbFISHment is unveiled with new sea life and hands-on-exhibits. The white alligator also returned to the aquarium for the summer.

In recent years, the Maritime Aquarium has emphasized helping visitors understand the ecology of Long Island Sound and its watershed. The aquarium participates in and directs local scientific research on Long Island Sound's animal residents, including a counting and tagging program for horseshoe crab and annual counts of harbor seal. The Maritime Aquarium also helped create the Long Island Sound Biodiversity Database, which is open to the public.

In 2006, the aquarium became a partner with SeafoodWatch, a program that encourages consumers to make responsible seafood choices that have a low impact on the environment and promote sustainable fisheries.

In February 2021, the aquarium replaced its now closed IMAX theatre with a new 4-D movie theatre.

Exhibits

On exhibit are more than 2,700 animals, representing in excess of 300 species.

As of 2019, exhibits include "Just Add Water," "Journey with Jellies," "Harbor Seals," "River Otters," "Shark and Ray Touch Pool," "Ocean Beyond the Sound," Sea Turtles," and "Jiggle-a-Jelly."

See also
 New York Aquarium, on Coney Island in the Brooklyn borough of New York City, is the closest aquarium to the Maritime Aquarium.
 Mystic Aquarium & Institute for Exploration is the only other aquarium in Connecticut and the only other aquarium on Long Island Sound.
 Long Island Aquarium and Exhibition Center in Riverhead, New York is a privately owned aquarium on the Peconic River at the eastern end of Long Island.

Notes

External links

Buildings and structures in Norwalk, Connecticut
Culture of Norwalk, Connecticut
Tourist attractions in Fairfield County, Connecticut
Aquaria in Connecticut
Tourist attractions in Norwalk, Connecticut